Gerda Nettesheim (1947–2011) was a German Sound artist. She studied flute and piano at the School of Music in Cologne. Her professional career began at the end of the 1970s and her first exhibitions were in 1981. Nettesheim's first exhibition took place shortly after the completion of her studies in 1981. This exhibition was organized by the Siegen Art Society, located in a small town near Bonn (in Villa). It was developed in collaboration with her husband, the sculptor Peter Nettesheim, and the art department of the University of Siegen.

References

1947 births
2011 deaths
Place of birth missing
Place of death missing
Date of birth missing
Date of death missing
German sound artists
Women sound artists
20th-century German women artists